Rosie Casals and Billie Jean King were the defending champions, but lost in the quarterfinals to Helen Gourlay and Karen Krantzcke.

Evonne Goolagong and Peggy Michel defeated Gourlay and Krantzcke in the final, 2–6, 6–4, 6–3 to win the ladies' doubles tennis title at the 1974 Wimbledon Championships.

Seeds

  Rosie Casals /  Billie Jean King (quarterfinals)
  Françoise Dürr /  Betty Stöve (quarterfinals)
  Chris Evert /  Olga Morozova (semifinals)
  Julie Heldman /  Virginia Wade (quarterfinals)

Draw

Finals

Top half

Section 1

Section 2

Bottom half

Section 3

Section 4

References

External links

1974 Wimbledon Championships – Women's draws and results at the International Tennis Federation

Women's Doubles
Wimbledon Championship by year – Women's doubles
Wimbledon Championships
Wimbledon Championships